The 1938 Rhode Island gubernatorial election was held on November 8, 1938. Republican nominee William Henry Vanderbilt III defeated Democratic incumbent Robert E. Quinn with 54.17% of the vote.

General election

Candidates
Major party candidates
William Henry Vanderbilt III, Republican
Robert E. Quinn, Democratic

Other candidates
Walter E. O'Hara, Independent
Morris Kominsky, Communist

Results

References

1938
Rhode Island